The 2000 NHL Expansion Draft was held on June 23, 2000, in Calgary, Alberta, Canada. The draft took place to fill the rosters of the league's two expansion teams for the 2000–01 season, the Columbus Blue Jackets and the Minnesota Wild.

Rules
26 of the 28 teams existing in the league at the time of the draft were each allowed to protect either one goaltender, five defensemen, and nine forwards or two goaltenders, three defensemen, and seven forwards. The Atlanta Thrashers and Nashville Predators had their entire rosters protected, as they were the two newest franchises in the league, only being in existence for one and two years respectively.

For teams protecting only one goaltender, there was no experience requirement for those left unprotected. For teams protecting two goaltenders, each goaltender left unprotected must have appeared in either 10 NHL games in the 1999–2000 season or 25 games in the 1998–99 season and 1999–2000 seasons combined. A goaltender had to be in net for at least 31 minutes in each game for the game to be counted against these totals.

At least one defenseman left unprotected by each team had to have appeared in at least 40 games in the 1999–2000 season or 70 games in the 1998–99 season and 1999–2000 seasons combined. At least two forwards left unprotected by each team had to have met the same requirements.

Fifty-two players were chosen in the draft; each previously existing team lost two players, and both expansion teams filled a roster of twenty-six players. Only one goaltender or one defenseman could be selected from each franchise. Both the Blue Jackets and the Wild were to use their first 24 selections on three goaltenders, eight defensemen, and thirteen forwards. The final two picks for each team could be any position.

Protected players

Eastern Conference

Western Conference

Draft results

Deals
In return for agreeing not to select certain unprotected players, the Blue Jackets and Wild were granted concessions by other franchises. The trades not involving Blue Jacket or Wild draft picks were booked as being for "future considerations":

Columbus
San Jose traded Jan Caloun, a ninth-round pick (Martin Paroulek) in the 2000 NHL Entry Draft, and a conditional pick in the 2001 NHL Entry Draft to Columbus on June 11, 2000, after the Blue Jackets agreed not to select Evgeni Nabokov.
Buffalo traded Jean-Luc Grand-Pierre, Matt Davidson, and two fifth-round draft picks, one each in the 2000 (Tyler Kolarik) and 2001 (Andreas Jamtin) Entry Drafts, to Columbus on June 23, 2000, after the Blue Jackets agreed not to select Dominik Hasek or Martin Biron.

Minnesota
San Jose traded Andy Sutton, a seventh-round pick (Peter Bartos) in the 2000 Entry Draft and a third-round pick (later traded to Columbus - (Aaron Johnson)) in the 2001 Entry Draft to Minnesota on June 11, 2000, for an eighth-round pick in the 2000 Entry Draft after the Wild agreed not to select Evgeni Nabokov.

Post-draft
Several of the players selected by the Blue Jackets and Wild in the Expansion Draft did not stay with the teams long after the draft. In fact, several players were traded later in the same day:

Columbus
Turner Stevenson (traded to New Jersey to complete an earlier transaction)

Minnesota
Mike Vernon (traded to Calgary for Dan Cavanaugh and an eighth-round pick (Joe Campbell) in the 2001 NHL Entry Draft)
Chris Terreri (traded with a ninth-round pick (Thomas Ziegler) in the 2000 NHL Entry Draft to New Jersey for Brad Bombardir)
Joe Juneau (traded to Phoenix for Rickard Wallin)

Other players who were no longer on the rosters of the teams which drafted them for the 1999–2000 season include the following:

Columbus
Dallas Drake (signed by St. Louis on July 1, 2000)
Mathieu Schneider (signed by Los Angeles on August 13, 2000)
Dwayne Roloson (signed with AHL's Worcester IceCats rather than joining Columbus)

Minnesota
Jeff Odgers (claimed off waivers by Atlanta on September 29, 2000)

See also
2000 NHL Entry Draft
2000–01 NHL season

References
NHL ground rules for 2000 Expansion Draft; backup link at Archive.org
Columbus Blue Jackets draft history
Usenet post explaining Expansion Draft rules

External links
 2000 NHL Expansion Draft player stats at The Internet Hockey Database

Expansion Draft
Columbus Blue Jackets
Minnesota Wild
National Hockey League expansion drafts